Hilde Fenne (born 12 May 1993) is a Norwegian biathlete.

Career
She took a bronze medal and a silver medal in mixed relay at the 2011 European Youth Winter Olympic Festival, and then two gold medals at the 2012 World Junior Championships. She made her Biathlon World Cup debut in November 2012 in Östersund.

She is also an able long-distance runner, who achieved her personal best of 10:14.21 minutes in the 3000 metres at the age of 17. She represents the club Voss IL.

She is a daughter of retired biathletes Gisle Fenne and Helga Øvsthus Fenne.

References

1993 births
Living people
People from Voss
Norwegian female biathletes
Norwegian female long-distance runners
Biathlon World Championships medalists
Sportspeople from Vestland
21st-century Norwegian women